Alalomantis muta, common name Cameroon mantis, is a species of praying mantis native to West Africa.

See also
List of mantis genera and species

References

Mantodea of Africa
Mantidae
Insects described in 1889